Eli is an unincorporated community in Wood County, West Virginia, United States.

References

Unincorporated communities in Wood County, West Virginia
Unincorporated communities in West Virginia